Newstead Girls' College, Negombo is the oldest existing girls' college and the third oldest public school in Sri Lanka, founded by Wesleyan ministers in 1815-1816.

History
Methodist missionaries founded the Wesleyan Methodist Sunday School in 1815, with Muhandiram L.E.Pereira as the head master. In September 1816, a regular school was established with the Rev. Don Daniel Pereira as the schoolmaster. On 17 September
1817, the Rev. Robert Newstead was appointed the first resident Minister of Negombo and the Dutch bungalow, which later came to be known as the Mission House was bought that same year.

In January 1818, a girls' school was proposed. In 1820, with the completion of the Wesleyan church, the Mission House was fully released for the school.

In 1883, the original cadjan classrooms were replaced by a permanent building. In 1895 the vernacular school was upgraded to the status of an English school.

In 1911 the school was transformed into the Wesleyan Girls English High School. In 1916 Claribel Beven became the first girl to get through the Elementary School Leaving Certificate Examination and in 1917 the first woman missionary principal, A. D. Dixon, was appointed.

In 1919 the school was renamed 'Newstead' after the first resident Minister of Negombo. In 1951, Newstead became an assisted school in terms of the Free Education Act of 1944. In 1962 the School was vested in the government, ending a period of 147 years during which the school was run by the Wesleyan Methodist Missionary Society.

Past Principals: 
 Mudlier L. E. Pereira
 Rev. Don Daniel Perera
 Rev. Robert Newstead ( - 1924 )
 Rev. Rigby
 Rev. H. S. Sanford ( 1885 - 1891 )
 Rev. M. Hartley ( 1898 - 1899 )
 Ms. C. H. Ward ( - 1902 )
 Ms. Lawrence ( - 1911 )
 Ms. Laura ( 1911 - 1913 )
 Ms. C. De Vos ( 1914 - 1916 )
 Ms. A. D. Dixon ( 1917 - 1942 )
 Ms. Grace Robins ( 1943 - 1951 )
 Ms. D. K. Williams ( 1951 - 1954 )
 Ms. Orloff ( 1955 - 1960 )
 Ms. Edith Ridge ( 1960 - 1962 )
 Ms. Clarice De Mel ( 1962 - 1975 )
 Ms. Rodrigo ( 1975 - 1982 )
 Ms. Gunaratne ( 1982 - 1983 )
 Ms. J. M. Sumanasinghe ( 1983 - 1985 )
 Ms. R. M. Senaratne ( 1985 - 2003 )
 Ms. B. M. Weerasuriya ( 2003 - 2008 )
 Ms. Gayani Herath ( 2008 - to date )

Motto 
The motto of the school is More Beyond, translated  from the Latin plus ultra , the motto of Francis Bacon, who used it, along with the device of a ship of discovery, sailing past the Pillars of Hercules, out of the small Mediterranean sea into the vast Atlantic Ocean beyond, to describe the knowledge he offered mankind. It is a symbol of transcendence: open systems go beyond boundaries and point past themselves, toward a greater universe; beyond the finite, there is the infinite; beyond the known, the unknown.

Houses 
 Ward House
Colour - Green
Motto - Do the Task Before You 
 Dixon House
Colour - Orange
Motto - Each for All and All for Each
 Hartley House
Colour - Yellow
Motto - Keep Smiling
 Lawrence House
Colour - Black
Motto - Up and On

Current Situation  
Currently the principal of Newstead Girls' College Negombo is Gayani Herath. The current population of the school is about 3,500. The tutorial staff consist of about 125 teachers.

Notable alumni

See also
List of the oldest schools in Sri Lanka

References

External links
Newstead Girls College homepage
 https://web.archive.org/web/20100730063852/http://www.ihgs.ac.uk/competition/robert_newstead.html - A Portrait of Robert Newstead - one of Wesley's missionaries by Jane Swan

Educational institutions established in 1815
Educational institutions established in 1816
Former Methodist schools in Sri Lanka
National schools in Sri Lanka
Girls' schools in Sri Lanka
Schools in Negombo
1815 establishments in Ceylon